is a Japanese footballer currently playing as a forward for Singapore Premier League club Lion City Sailors. He won the SPL Player Of The Year and was nominated for SPL Team Of The Year in 2022. He is known for his finishing in the box and powerful shots with either foot.

Youth Career 
Kodai came through the ranks of the Yokohama F. Marinos youth team and then Tokai University Kofu High School and Takushoku University before being picked up by Albirex Niigata Singapore FC.

Club career

Albriex Niigata (Singapore) 
Kodai started his professional career with Albirex Niigata Singapore FC in the 2022 Singapore Premier League. In his first 11 matches, he has notched 12 goals, of which 7 had came from headers. As part of Albirex's "LIT" frontline comprising ex-Southampton and Japan man Tadanari Lee, Ilhan Fandi and himself, the trio have combined for 57 goals in 26 league matches - more than five of the other seven teams in the SPL, with Kodai himself notching 31 goals. He ended his first professional season as the second top goalscorer in the league, with 33 goals in 28 games.

Lion City Sailors 
After a stunning 2022 campaign, he will be part of the Sailors set-up which is looking to reclaim the SPL trophy in 2023 season.  He is over-aged for the 2023 season as the White Swan is a U23 team.

Career statistics

Club
.

Honours

Club

Albriex Niigata (S) 

 Singapore Premier League: 2022

Individual

Albirex Niigata (Singapore) 

 Singapore Premier League Player of the Year: 2022

References

1999 births
Living people
Association football people from Kanagawa Prefecture
Takushoku University alumni
Japanese footballers
Japanese expatriate footballers
Association football forwards
Singapore Premier League players
Yokohama F. Marinos players
Albirex Niigata Singapore FC players
Japanese expatriate sportspeople in Singapore
Expatriate footballers in Singapore
21st-century Japanese people